James Harington or Harrington may refer to:

 Sir James Harrington (Yorkist knight), 15th century MP for Lancashire
 James Harrington (priest) (16th century), dean of York
 Sir James Harington (lawyer) (c. 1510–1592), English public servant
 James Harrington, Lord Mayors of York in 1560
 James Harrington (author) (1611–1677), sometimes spelled Harington, English political philosopher, known for Oceana
 James Harrington (1664–1693), lawyer and poet
 James Harrington (Georgia politician), American politician who ran in the 2000 US House of Representatives elections in Georgia
 James Harrington, former mayor of Brockton, Massachusetts
 James C. Harrington, Texas civil rights lawyer
Five Harington baronets have had the name James including:
 James Harington (1542–1614) of Ridlington, brother of John Harington, 1st Baron Harington, MP for Rutland, high sheriff of Rutland and Oxfordshire
 Sir James Harington, 3rd Baronet (1607–1680), officer in the New Model Army and regicide

See also
 Harrington (surname)